Nick Manning (born May 28, 1967) is an American pornographic actor and director. He has made several mainstream appearances, including Crank: High Voltage, Hogan Knows Best, and Sons of Anarchy. Manning portrayed a strip club owner in the 2011 independent film Cherry Bomb, his first non-pornographic lead role. In 2014, he was inducted into the AVN Hall of Fame.

Early years
Nick Manning was born in Chicago, Illinois.

Mainstream appearances
For Cinemax in 2001, Manning appeared in Thrills. He made brief appearances on the reality show Hogan Knows Best and in the 2009 film Crank: High Voltage. Included in Nick Manning's roles within non-adult movies are For The Love of The Game, Any Given Sunday, All My Children and the TV show The Fugitive. In 2012, he appeared as the head lifeguard "Jack Foster" in Showtime's Beach Heat. He filmed his first leading role in a non-adult film, playing the strip club owner "Ian Benedict" in the indie film Cherry Bomb.

Awards
 2003 AVN Award – Best Male Newcomer
 2003 NightMoves Award – Best Actor (Editor's Choice)
 2014 AVN Hall of Fame inductee

Partial filmography

See also
 Jenna Presley

References

External links
 
 
 
 
 Nick Manning Training With a Pro

1967 births
21st-century American male actors
Living people
American male adult models
American male pornographic film actors
American pornographic film directors
Male actors from Chicago
People from Chicago
Pornographic film actors from Illinois